John F. Wright (December 24, 1945 – March 18, 2018) was an American court justice of the Nebraska Supreme Court, appointed by Governor Ben Nelson in 1994. Wright was born in Scottsbluff, Nebraska. He received his bachelor's degree and law degree from the University of Nebraska-Lincoln College of Law He served in the Nebraska National Guard from 1970 to 1976. Wright practiced law from 1970 to 1991. In 1991, Wright was appointed to the Nebraska State Court of Appeals. Wright died after a long illness on March 18. 2018.

See also
Nebraska Supreme Court
Nebraska State Court of Appeals

References

 

1945 births
2018 deaths
Nebraska state court judges
Justices of the Nebraska Supreme Court
University of Nebraska College of Law alumni
People from Scottsbluff, Nebraska
Military personnel from Nebraska
20th-century American judges
21st-century American judges